The 1981–82 NHL season was the 65th season of the National Hockey League. The William M. Jennings Trophy made its debut this year as the trophy for the goaltenders from the team with the fewest goals against, thus replacing the Vezina Trophy in that qualifying criteria. The Vezina Trophy would thereafter be awarded to the goaltender adjudged to be the best at his position. The New York Islanders won their third straight Stanley Cup by sweeping the Vancouver Canucks in four games.

League business
Prior to the start of the season, the divisions of the league were re-aligned to reduce travel costs to better reflect their geographic locations, but the traditional names of the divisions and conferences were retained. The Patrick Division, which had heretofore been in the Clarence Campbell Conference, switched to the Prince of Wales Conference, while the Norris Division went the other way, going from the Wales Conference to the Campbell Conference. This divisional alignment existed until the 1993–94 season, at which point both the divisions and the conferences of the league were renamed to reflect geography.

The schedule and playoff format were also altered. Previously, each team played every other team four times, and the 16-team playoff format had the four divisional champions joined by 12 wild-cards; for all intents and purposes, the divisions were meaningless. Also, under the old format, teams were paired in the first round based on record (i.e., 1st vs. 16th, 2nd vs. 15th, etc.), and then re-paired in each succeeding round based on record (i.e., highest seeded first round winner vs. lowest seeded first round winner, second highest first round winner vs. second lowest first round winner, etc.)

The new format called for each team in the three five-team divisions to play their four divisional opponents eight times each (32 games) and the remaining 16 league teams three times each (48 games).  In addition, each team in the six-team division was to play their five divisional opponents seven times each (35 games) and the remaining 15 league teams three times each (45 games).  As to the playoffs, the top four teams in each division qualified — no more wild-cards — with 1st Place playing 4th Place, and 2nd Place playing 3rd Place, in the divisional semifinals; the two winners meeting in the divisional finals; followed by the respective conference finals and the Stanley Cup finals. With the exception of the first round changing from a best-of-five to a best-of-seven in 1987, this schedule and playoff arrangement continued until 1993.

Beginning with this season, the Prince of Wales Trophy and the Clarence S. Campbell Bowl were awarded to the Wales Conference (Eastern Conference since 1993) playoffs champion and the Campbell Conference (Western Conference since 1993) playoffs champion, respectively.

Regular season
The New York Islanders led the league with 118 points, seven more than second place Edmonton Oilers. The Islanders also set a league record by winning 15 consecutive games from January 21 to February 20 although this was later eclipsed by the Pittsburgh Penguins' 17-game winning streak  from March 9 to April 10, 1993. However, the Islanders 15-game winning streak was accomplished before the advent of the extra OT period in the NHL regular season. The Penguins would need to win 2 of their games in the OT period (in games 2 and 15) and would not have accomplished their streak in 1993 without the extra period, as two of their games would have ended in a tie. Likewise, the Islanders in 1982 (unlike the Penguins in 1993) did not have to risk a loss in overtime, thus endangering their winning streak.

The Edmonton Oilers' young superstar Wayne Gretzky broke several records, including the record of 50 goals in 50 games, set by Maurice Richard and Mike Bossy, by scoring 50 goals in only 39 games. Gretzky also broke Phil Esposito's record of 76 goals in a season with 92, his own assists record of 109 which was set the prior season with 120, and his own point total of 164 which was also set the prior season with 212. He was the first, and thus far only, player to ever score 200 points in a season. The Oilers set a record for most goals in a season with 417, in which Gretzky scored or assisted on over half.

The New York Islanders' Mike Bossy set a regular season scoring record for right-wingers with 147 points in an 80 game season, and finished as runner-up to Gretzky for the Art Ross Trophy.

This was the final season of the Colorado Rockies before moving to New Jersey to become the Devils. The NHL would return to the Denver area in 1995, when the Quebec Nordiques relocate to become the Colorado Avalanche.

The Winnipeg Jets completed one of the biggest single-season turnarounds in league history as the Jets went from nine wins and 32 points in 1980–81 to 33 wins and 80 points.

The Philadelphia Flyers become the first team to wear long pants. The idea was to create a more streamlined uniform with lighter padding, thus making the players faster. The downside was that the players slid into the boards faster after being bodychecked.

Final standings
Note: GP = Games played; W = Wins; L = Losses; T = Ties; GF = Goals for; GA = Goals against; Pts = Points; PIM = Penalties in minutes

Note: Teams that qualified for the playoffs are highlighted in bold

Prince of Wales Conference

Clarence Campbell Conference

Playoffs

Playoff bracket

The 1982 playoffs used a new format.  Four teams from each division would qualify for the playoffs, and played a best-of-five semifinal round followed by a best-of-seven series to determine the division playoff champions. The Adams and Patrick winners would meet in the Wales Conference Final, while the Norris and Smythe winners played in the Campbell Conference Final.  The two Conference Champions played for the Stanley Cup. With the exception of extending the first round to a best-of-seven in 1987, this format remained in place through the 1993 playoffs.

The first round of the 1982 playoffs saw three first-place teams (Edmonton, Minnesota, and Montreal) upset by fourth-place teams, a round which featured what is still the greatest comeback in NHL history:  The Kings' 6–5 win over Edmonton in game three.  After trailing 5–0 after two periods, the Kings scored five third period goals—three in the last 5:22, the final goal coming with only five seconds left in regulation.  Los Angeles then scored on a face-off early in overtime, thus completing the "Miracle on Manchester".

The eventual champion New York Islanders nearly lost in the first round as well, dropping games three and four of their first round playoff series with Pittsburgh after crushing the Penguins in the first two games.  In game five, the Islanders scored twice in the last five minutes to force overtime and then won the series on John Tonelli's goal 6:19 into the extra session.  This served as a wake-up call for New York, who lost only two more games the rest of the way as they rolled to their third straight Stanley Cup.  Their Final opponents, the Vancouver Canucks, finished the regular season with only 77 points, defeating three teams beneath them in the standings (Calgary 75, Los Angeles 63, and Chicago 72) in the much weaker Campbell Conference.

Stanley Cup Finals

Awards
From this season forward, the Prince of Wales and Clarence S. Campbell trophies were given to the playoff champions of the respective conferences.

All-Star teams

Player statistics

Scoring leaders
Note: GP = Games played; G = Goals; A = Assists; Pts = Points

Source: NHL.

Leading goaltenders

Coaches

Patrick Division
New York Islanders: Al Arbour
New York Rangers: Herb Brooks
Philadelphia Flyers: Pat Quinn and Bob McCammon
Pittsburgh Penguins: Eddie Johnston
Washington Capitals: Danny Belisle

Adams Division
Boston Bruins: Gerry Cheevers
Buffalo Sabres: Jimmy Roberts
Hartford Whalers: Larry Pleau
Montreal Canadiens: Bob Berry
Quebec Nordiques: Michel Bergeron

Norris Division
Chicago Black Hawks: Keith Magnuson and Bob Pulford
Detroit Red Wings: Wayne Maxner
Minnesota North Stars: Glen Sonmor
St. Louis Blues: Red Berenson and Emile Francis
Toronto Maple Leafs: Mike Nykoluk
Winnipeg Jets: Tom Watt

Smythe Division
Calgary Flames: Al MacNeil
Colorado Rockies: Bill MacMillan
Edmonton Oilers: Glen Sather
Los Angeles Kings: Parker MacDonald
Vancouver Canucks: Harry Neale and Roger Neilson

Milestones

Debuts
The following is a list of players of note who played their first NHL game in 1981–82 (listed with their first team, asterisk(*) marks debut in playoffs):
Jiri Bubla, Vancouver Canucks
Garth Butcher, Vancouver Canucks
Bob Carpenter, Washington Capitals
Gaetan Duchesne, Washington Capitals
Ron Francis, Hartford Whalers
Grant Fuhr, Edmonton Oilers
Randy Gregg*, Edmonton Oilers
Dale Hawerchuk, Winnipeg Jets
Ivan Hlinka, Vancouver Canucks
Tim Hunter, Calgary Flames
Pelle Lindbergh, Philadelphia Flyers
Al MacInnis, Calgary Flames
Mike Vernon, Calgary Flames
Bernie Nicholls, Los Angeles Kings
Marian Stastny, Quebec Nordiques
Thomas Steen, Winnipeg Jets
Tony Tanti, Chicago Black Hawks
John Vanbiesbrouck, New York Rangers

Last games
The following is a list of players of note that played their last game in the NHL in 1981–82 (listed with their last team):
Don Marcotte, Boston Bruins
Dick Redmond, Boston Bruins
Rogie Vachon, Boston Bruins
Yvon Lambert, Buffalo Sabres
Bill Clement, Calgary Flames
Bob Murdoch, Calgary Flames
Eric Vail, Detroit Red Wings
Dave Keon, Hartford Whalers
Paul Shmyr, Hartford Whalers
Rick Martin, Los Angeles Kings
Steve Vickers, New York Rangers
Bob Dailey, Philadelphia Flyers
Jimmy Watson, Philadelphia Flyers
Gregg Sheppard, Pittsburgh Penguins
Ron Stackhouse, Pittsburgh Penguins
Don Luce, Toronto Maple Leafs
Rene Robert, Toronto Maple Leafs
Bob Kelly, Washington Capitals
Jean Pronovost, Washington Capitals

See also 
 List of Stanley Cup champions
 1981 NHL Entry Draft
 1981–82 NHL transactions
 34th National Hockey League All-Star Game
 National Hockey League All-Star Game
 1981 Canada Cup
 1981 in sports
 1982 in sports

References
 
 
 
 
 

Notes

External links
Hockey Database
NHL.com

 

 
1
1